"Jezebel" is a song by Finnish rock band The Rasmus, released as a single on 18 January 2022. It was co-written and produced by lead singer Lauri Ylönen and Desmond Child. The song represented Finland at the Eurovision Song Contest 2022, held in Turin, Italy, in May 2022, opening the second semi-final on 12 May. It won the 2022 edition of Finland's annual Eurovision song selection competition, Uuden Musiikin Kilpailu, on 26 February 2022 with a total of 310 points. The single reached number four in Finland.

Background
Ylönen said the song is "about a girl who takes what she wants, without asking. A free spirit", as well as "an homage, a tribute, to the strong women of today, who own their bodies, who are in charge of their sensuality, their sexuality, and who are determined to be an equal". The band had previously worked with Desmond Child on their 2008 album Black Roses, and called it "awesome" to work with him again, saying he "knows how to put a hit song together". The song title references Jezebel, a Biblical figure who was the Queen of Israel.

Track listing

Charts

References

2022 singles
2022 songs
Eurovision songs of 2022
Eurovision songs of Finland
Playground Music Scandinavia singles
Song recordings produced by Desmond Child
Songs written by Desmond Child
Songs written by Lauri Ylönen
The Rasmus songs